Polymorph Records is a record label based in London, England.

In 2010 they released the debut single by Jamie West, called "Give Me Everything You Got".

Their most recent release is by singer-songwriter Joshua Fisher who released his debut EP "Atlas" on 25 October 2010.  It was co-produced by Roger Pusey.

Their latest signing is Jake Benson, a young singer from London.

References

External links
 Polymorph Records Ltd
 Jamie West
 Joshua Fisher
 Jake Benson

British record labels